The Pipeline and Hazardous Materials Safety Administration (PHMSA) is a United States Department of Transportation agency created in 2004, responsible for developing and enforcing regulations for the safe, reliable, and environmentally sound transportation of energy and other hazardous materials that are essential to the daily lives of the American people. It is in charge of overseeing the nation's approximately 3.4 million miles of pipelines - accounting for 65% of the energy consumed in the U.S. - and regulating the nearly 1 million daily shipments of hazardous materials by land, sea, and air. PHMSA's safety programs are housed in the Office of Pipeline Safety (OPS) and the Office of Hazardous Materials Safety (OHMS). PHMSA is headquartered in Washington, D.C. 

PHMSA was created within the U.S. Department of Transportation under the Norman Y. Mineta Research and Special Programs Improvement Act of 2004, which then-United States President George W. Bush signed into law on November 30, 2004. Its mission is to protect people and the environment by advancing the safe transportation of energy and other hazardous materials that are essential to the people's daily lives.

History
Prior to 2005 the U.S. Department of Transportation had no focused research organization and no separately operating administration for pipeline safety and hazardous materials transportation safety in the United States. The Norman Y. Mineta Research and Special Programs Improvement Act of 2004 provided these, with an opportunity to establish mode government budget and information practices in support of then president Bush's "Management Agenda" initiatives. Prior to the Special Programs Act of 2004, PHMSA's hazmat and pipeline safety programs were housed within the Transportation Department's Research and Special Programs Administration, known as RSPA.

Office of Hazardous Materials Safety
The Office of Hazardous Materials Safety is responsible for the oversight of the safe transportation of hazardous materials by air, rail, highway, and vessel. More than 3.3 billion tons of hazardous materials valued at more than $1.9 trillion are transported annually by air, highway, rail, and vessel across the United States. On average, more than 1.2 million hazardous materials shipments occur every day. This includes everything from nuclear waste to lithium-ion batteries, to explosives used in excavation, mining, and energy production. The program establishes policy, standards and regulations for classifying, packaging, hazard communication, handling, training and transporting hazardous materials via air, highway, rail and vessel. The program uses inspection, enforcement, outreach and incident analysis in efforts to reduce incidents, minimize fatalities and injuries, mitigate the consequences of incidents that occur, train and prepare first responders, and enhance safety.

Office of Pipeline Safety

The Office of Pipeline Safety regulates an expansive network of approximately 3.4 million miles of natural gas pipeline system in the United States and its hazardous liquid pipelines. This includes 229,000 miles of hazardous liquid pipelines, 302,000 miles of gas transmission pipelines, 2,284,000 miles of gas distribution mains and services, and 17,000 miles of gas-gathering pipelines. PHMSA’s pipeline safety program promotes the safe delivery of energy products to market in a manner that protects people, property, and the environment. The Office of Pipeline Safety is headquartered in Washington, D.C., with eight field offices located in West Trenton, NJ; Atlanta, GA; Kansas City, MO; Houston, TX; Lakewood, CO; Des Plaines, IL; Ontario, CA; and Anchorage, AK. PHMSA also operates a national training center and accident investigation office located in Oklahoma City, OK.

Leadership
Tristan Brown serves as the Deputy Administrator of PHMSA. The current leadership team includes:

Past leadership includes
 Brigham McCown, first acting administrator July 1, 2005 until March 31, 2006 and first Deputy Administrator, July 1, 2005 until January 1, 2007.
 Thomas J. Barrett, first permanent Administrator from March 31, 2006 - June 1, 2007.
 Stacey Gerard, first Assistant Administrator/Chief Safety Officer, first acting Deputy Administrator until July 1, 2005.
 Krista Edwards, Chief Counsel in 2006, Deputy Administrator, acting Administrator in late 2007.
 Carl T. Johnson, Administrator from January 9, 2008 until 2009. 
Cynthia L. Quarterman, Administrator from November 16, 2009 - October 4, 2014
Timothy Butters, acting Administrator from October 4, 2014 - June 8, 2015
Marie Therese Dominguez, Administrator from October 7, 2015 until 2016
Howard "Skip" Elliott, Administrator from October 30, 2017 - January 20, 2021

See also
 List of North American natural gas pipelines
 List of pipeline accidents in the United States in the 21st century
 Weld monitoring, testing and analysis
 Robotic Non-Destructive Testing
 Intelligent pigging
 Emergency Response Guidebook

Notes

References

External links
 
 Pipeline and Hazardous Materials Safety Administration in the Federal Register
 PHMSA Public Map Viewer - Application enables the user to view the National Pipeline Mapping System (NPMS) data one county at a time. The user may zoom in to a map scale of 1:24,000.

Energy in the United States
United States Department of Transportation agencies
2004 establishments in the United States
Government agencies established in 2004
Oil pipelines in the United States
Natural gas safety
Pipeline and Hazardous Materials Safety